The Carter County Museum, is a local and natural history museum located in Ekalaka, Montana. It was founded in 1936 and is the first county museum in Montana. The museum is one of several in the state on the Montana Dinosaur Trail, a collection of museums with unique paleontology displays.

The collections at the museum include a large dinosaur exhibit, a focus on natural history, ranch and homestead life, and a veteran's room that covers the people from the area that traveled to war since the founding of the county in 1917.

Exhibits

Dinosaurs 
Carter County contains part of the Hell Creek Formation, and many paleontologists visit the area each summer to look for more fossilized remains. Fossils from Carter County are found in many of the science museums in the country.  The Carter County Museum itself contains several significant fossils, largely collected on private land in the 1930s and 1940s including one of the most complete Edmontosaurus (called Anatotitan copei) found. There is also a complete Triceratops skull.

The dinosaur exhibits are rotated from the museum's stored collections.

Local history and natural history 
Aside from dinosaurs, there is also significant exhibit space given to other later animals and geological features. The museum also hosts a wide range of exhibits including a firearms display, old equipment from early in the life of Ekalaka, pictures of towns that lived and died in the past century, and flavors of life for the thousands of early homesteaders who tried to make a living on the dry land.

Dino Shindig 

Established in 2013, the annual Dino Shindig is a gathering of paleontologists, dinosaur enthusiasts, and community members for a weekend of lectures, kids activities, field expeditions, live music and more. Previous lecturers have included Kirk Johnson and Jack Horner. This event, occurring the last weekend of July, has received global attendance.

References

External links
 Carter County Museum - official site

Museums in Carter County, Montana
Natural history museums in Montana
Dinosaur museums in the United States
History museums in Montana
Paleontology in Montana
Museums established in 1936
1936 establishments in Montana